The list contains a selection of the mountains and hills in the Black Forest, in order of their height.

Over 1,400 m 

 Feldberg (1,493 m), highest mountain in the German Central Uplands
 Baldenweger Buck (1,460 m), northern subpeak of the  Feldberg
 Seebuck (1,448 m), southeastern subpeak of the Feldberg
 Herzogenhorn (1,415 m), south of the Feldberg
 Belchen (1,414 m), southwest of the Feldberg

Over 1,300 m 

 Stübenwasen (1,386 m), between Feldberg and Notschrei
 Grafenmatte (1,377 m), between Feldberg and Herzogenhorn
 Immisberg (1,373 m), northwest of the Feldberg
 Silberberg (1,358 m), between Todtnau-Brandenberg and Herzogenhorn
 Spießhorn (1,349 m), between Bernau-Hof and Menzenschwand
 Toter Mann (1,321 m), between Feldberg and Oberried
 Bärhalde (1,317), between Neuglashütten and Menzenschwand
 Köpfle (Feldberger Hof) (1,317 m), near the Feldberger Hof
 Blößling (1,309 m), southwest of Bernau
 Schweizerwald (1,305 m), 3 km north of the Seebuck

Over 1,200 m 

 Schnepfhalde (1,299 m), between Schluchsee and Menzenschwand
 Schauinsland (1,284 m), local mountain of Freiburg im Breisgau
 Trubelsmattkopf (1,281 m), between Notschrei, Muggenbrunn and Wiedener Eck
 Heidstein (1,274 m), between Belchen and Wiedener Eck
 Oberer Habsberg (1,274 m), west of the Schluchsee (often wrongly spelt Hubsberg; other tops at 1,263 m and 1,253 m)
 Unterer Habsberg (1,204 m)
 Kapellenkopf (1,273 m), between Schluchsee-Aha and Bernau-Hinterdorf
 Wieswaldkopf (1,270 m), between Feldberg and Hinterzarten
 Haldenköpfle (1,265 m), between Schauinsland and Notschrei
 Hirschkopf (1,264 m), between St. Wilhelm and Notschrei
 Hochfahrn (1,264 m), between Feldberg and Oberried
 Hochkopf (1,263 m), between Neuglashütten and Feldberg by the Bundesstraße 317
 Schweinekopf (1,257 m), west of the Blößling
 Schmaleck (1,253 m), between St. Wilhelm and Feldberg
 Ahornkopf (1,243 m), between Notschrei and St. Wilhelm
 Gisiboden (1,243 m), between Todtnau and Bernau
 Hohe Zinken (1,242 m), southwest of Bernau
 Kandel (1,241 m), between St. Peter (High Black Forest) and the Elz valley
 Köpfle (Todtnau) (1,235 m), northwest of Todtnau-Muggenbrunn
 Köhlgarten (1,224 m), between Belchen and Blauen
 Horneck (1,222 m), between Hinterzarten and Oberried
 Farnberg (1,218 m), between Todtmoos-Rütte and St. Blasien
 Bankgallihöhe (1,210 m), between Hinterzarten and Oberried
 Bötzberg (1,209 m), between Schluchsee and St. Blasien
 Windeckkopf (1,209 m), southwest of Hinterzarten
 Sengalenkopf (1,208 m), 2 km east of Todtnau-Gschwend
 Hochgescheid (1,205 m), 3 km southeast of Schönau

Over 1,100 m 

 Hinterwaldkopf (1,198 m), between Oberried and Hinterzarten
 Hochfirst (1,190 m), 3 km east of the Titisee
 Weißtannenhöhe (1,190 m), 5 km north of the Titisee
 Wiedener Hörnle (1,187 m), between Notschrei and Wiedener Eck
 Obereck (1,177 m), 2 km southwest of the Rohrhardsberg (on the older maps the 1180 metre contour was shown)
 Griesbacher Eck (1,172 m), near the Obereck
 Dachsbühl (1,171 m), near the Erlenbach Hut
 Rohrenkopf (1,170 m), north of Gersbach
 Blauen (also Hochblauen; 1,165 m), southeast of Badenweiler
 Hornisgrinde (1,164 m), (highest mountain of the Northern Black Forest)
 Hasenhorn (1,156 m), 1 km southeast of Todtnau
 Kaiserberg (1,156 m), by Riggenbach in the municipality of Bernau
 Roteck (1,156 m), 1 km northwest of the Hinterwaldkopf
 Roßeck (1,154 m), 7 km northwest of Furtwangen
 Herrenschwander Kopf (1,152 m), 5 km southeast of Schönau
 Rohrhardsberg (1,152 m), between Elzach and Furtwangen
 Brend (1,149 m), 5 km northwest of Furtwangen
 Ibichkopf (1,146 m), 3 km subpeak of the Obereck
 Steinberg (1,141 m), 2 km northeast of Waldau
 Staldenkopf (1,135 m), 1.5 km south of Todtnau-Gschwend
 Bossenbühl (1,128 m), 2 km east of Waldau
 Roßberg (1,125 m), 500 m north of Breitnau
 Knöpflesbrunnen (1,124 m), 2 km west of Todtnau
 Hornkopf (1,121 m), 2 km south of Simonswald
 Hohwart (1,120 m), 2.5 km northwest of Breitnau
 Notschrei (1,119 m), pass between Oberried and Todtnau
 Eckle (1,114 m), between Hinterzarten and Feldberg-Bärental
 Sirnitzkopf (1,114 m), 7 km east of Badenweiler

Over 1,000 m 

 Altsteigerskopf (1,092 m), 4 km southeast of the Hornisgrinde
 Geißkopf (1,090 m), 3.5 km southeast of the Hornisgrinde
 Tafelbühl (1,084 m), 3 km west of the Rohrhardsberg
 Hundsrücken (1,080 m), northeast of the Hornisgrinde
 Zeller Blauen (today more rarely the Hochblauen; 1,077 m), 3 km north of Zell i. W.
 Schultiskopf (1,077 m), 3 km east of Altsimonswald
 Sommerberg (1,076 m), 3 km southeast of Furtwangen
 Hohspirn (1,074 m), between Falkau and Lenzkirch-Raitenbuch
 Steiertenkopf (1,073 m), between Feldberg and Hinterzarten
 Schattann (1,067 m), 2.5 km west of Bürchau
 Stöcklewald (1,067 m), 5 km south of Triberg
 Schwarzkopf (1,057 m), south of the Hornisgrinde
 Vogelskopf (1,056 m), 5 km south of the Hornisgrinde
 Hoher Ochsenkopf (1,055 m), 6.5 km northeast of the Hornisgrinde, highest mountain in the county of Rastatt
 Schliffkopf (1,055 m), by the Black Forest High Road
 Seekopf (1,055 m), above Seebach (Baden), four kilometres southeast of the Hornisgrinde
 Bosberg (1,052 m) 
 Geisberg (1,047 m), 3 km northeast of the Rohrhardsberg, near Schonach
 Gschasikopf (1,045 m), 6 km north of the Rohrhardsberg
 Otten (1,041 m), between Buchenbach and Breitnau
 Hochkopf (1,039 m), north of the Hornisgrinde
 Bubshorn (1,032 m), Fröhnd/Pfaffenberg
 Kesselberg (1,024 m), west of Oberkirnach (St. Georgen)
 Honeck (1,022 m), east of Bürchau
 Pfälzer Kopf (1,013 m), 6 km southeast of the Hornisgrinde
 Mehliskopf (1,008 m), above the Black Forest High Road
 Schlegelberg (1,005 m)
 Muhrkopf (1,003 m), 2 km north of the Hornisgrinde
 Badener Höhe (1,002.5 m), near Baden-Baden
 Seekopf (1,001.1 m), east of the Badener Höhe and ten kilometres northeast of the Hornisgrinde
 Riesenköpfle (1,000.8 m), 7.5 km southeast of the Hornisgrinde

Up to 1,000 m 

 Mühleberg (995 m), local mountain of Vöhrenbach
 Hohloh (988 m), near Gernsbach-Kaltenbronn
 Hohe Möhr (983 m), near Zell in the Wiesental
 Kniebis (971 m), near Freudenstadt
 Lettstädter Höhe (966 m), southwest of Kniebis
 Brandenkopf (945 m)
 Teufelsmühle (908 m), east of Gernsbach near Loffenau
 Hörnleberg (907 m)
 Mooskopf (877.5 m), highest point of Gengenbach
 Sulgener Berg (763.5 m), near Sulgen, Rottweil
 Rinkenkopf (759.6 m), near Baiersbronn
 Roßkopf (737 m), near Freiburg im Breisgau
 Bernstein (694 m), local mountain of Gaggenau
 Brandeckkopf (686 m), local mountain of Zell-Weierbach, Offenburg
 Merkur (668 m), local mountain of Baden-Baden
 Egenhäuser Kapf (625 m)
 Mahlberg (613 m), near Gaggenau, highest point in the county of Karlsruhe
 Battert (568 m), near Baden-Baden, with the well-known Battertfelsen climbing area
 Fremersberg (525 m), west of Baden-Baden
 Geißkopf (359 m), hill near Berghaupten with old military encampment
 Hornberg (356.5 m), hill in the Breisgau, near Kollmarsreute (Emmendingen), Emmendingen, Baden-Württemberg

See also 
 List of mountains of Baden-Württemberg

References 

Black Forest Club map with data by the Baden-Württemberg Survey Department

!
!
Black Forest